Saint-Matré (Languedocien: Sent Matre) is a former commune in the Lot department in south-western France. On 1 January 2019, it was merged into the new commune of Porte-du-Quercy.

Etymology 
A local tradition according to which the toponym was derived from St. Amator is rather doubtful given the old forms of the name that have come down to us.  No saint is mentioned in the medieval pouillés , the village being called Samatre.  A 14th century pouillé mentions Samayré. We can find Samatré or Samatan in the 15th century texts, then Saint-Mathié in 1526 and Saint-Matré du Crucifix in 1679.

So we see there is no question of any Christian influence to the toponym. Its name could derive from a Gallo-Roman domain belonging to a certain Samitius, but there are no archaeological data to support such a view.

Administration
List of mayors since 1802 :

1802-1804: Jean Basset
1804-1809: Jean Bessières
1809-1814: Armand David
1815-1831: Jean-Baptiste Estang
1831-1843: Jean Bessières
1843-1855: Paul David
1855-1863: Jean Bessières 
1863-1878: Étienne Frezal
1878-1884: Émile Pignier
1884-1902: Jean Jordy
2001-2019: Christian Bessières

See also
Communes of the Lot department

Notes

References

External links 
 

Saintmatre